Panagiotis Stravalexis (born 28 September 1979), also known by his stage names Waze-Taki-Tsan (short for Westley) Timvorihos, Pedi Thavma and Taki Tsan, is a Greek music producer, tattoo artist and rapper. He is a founding member of the group Zontanoi Nekroi and also a member of the rap duet Tigre Sporakia, .

In 1999, he released his solo debut album under the name Pedi Thavma, named Rima Gia Chrima. Taki Tsan was also a founding member of the rap group Tigre Sporakia, which consisted of him and Isvoleas.

Several albums followed, some of them being solo ones, like Sto Mialo Tou Panagioti Stravaleksi, released in 2006. Another one was To Scholeio, where he collaborated with another Zontanoi Nekroi member, Harmanis. In 2009, Tsan released Rima gia Chrima 2, his new double LP.

Biography

1997-1998: Zontanoi Nekroi
In 1997, he formed his group, Zontanoi Nekroi, and started recording tracks with them.
They released an EP in 1997, named "ZN Entoles/Stin Chora ton Kaliteron MCs". In 1998, they released their first and only album O Protos Tomos which at that time was considered offensive by a lot of people because in that album the group was dealing with subjects like drugs and violence.

1999: Pedi Thavma – Rima gia Hrima
He continued with Rima gia Hrima (English: Rhyme for Money), his solo debut, that was well received. This album's style was very different than his previous ZN albums' raw style and had a more personal feeling. It is considered to be one of the best Greek Hip-Hop albums.

2000: Projects that never made it
In 2001, they were about to release Harmanis' debut solo named Sisihaha but that project never made it either due to unknown reasons. So, having collected several unreleased songs, they released a compilation album named Thammena Ksechasmena which contained songs from Kata.R.Ypo, a song that did not fit in Rima gia Chrima, the first track that was recorded for Megalos Iroas, Midenistis' first solo album, and some alternate editions of old songs from "O Protos Tomos".
As for a second ZN release, many fans wanted to see a new release from their favorite group, but as it seems that can't happen because every member has its own projects and want to do different things in music. The highly anticipated album is called O Deuteros Tomos and will be the sequel of O Protos Tomos.

2003–2004: Tigre Sporakia and Harmanis/Taki Tsan
In 2003, Taki Tsan formed a new group with Isvoleas (a member of the group Alfa Gama) named Tigre Sporakia. They released their first album named Theoria kai Praksi, which was well received by the fans. Taki returned to his raw style and one of the main themes of the album was drugs and money.
In 2004, Taki Tsan and Harmanis collaborated to release an album named To Sholio (English: The School). The album was ready in about 11 days and the main producer was DJ ALX.

2005–2006: 3 Mixtapes and one solo album
In 2005, Taki Tsan released 2 mix tapes. One named Underground Mixtape, and one more named Mixtape vol. 1 from IxoSpira. In 2006, he released his last mix tape to date named Misa Lefta/Dipli Magkia which was more like a compilation, containing old and unreleased songs. In the same year, he released his 2nd solo album named Sto Mialo tou Panagioti Stravalexi. It was a major change to his style, containing social and political tracks, as well as things he wanted to share with his fans.

2007–2009: Many lives and Recording of his new album
He has done many lives, 3 with all of the ZN members. He has also released several tracks on the internet, to give us a taste of his upcoming project, named Rima gia Chrima 2009 (sequel to his debut), which was released in December 2009 under the final name "Rima gia Chrima 2", a double album which met a great economical success, as it sold about 5,000 copies.

2009–2012: Rima gia Chrima Tour, TOMAHOK, 2 more mixtapes and Tigre Sporakia the Band
After the release of "Rima gia Chrima 2", Taki Tsan and many of his affiliates began his "Rima gia Chrima Tour" all over Greece, with more than 20 live performances. After the end of the tour, he and Isvoleas started to work on their second project as Tigre Sporakia but this time with a live band with them. The group was renamed Tigre Sporakia the Band and changed their logo. Also at that time, Taki's official website, [takitsan.com] opened for the fans and in order to celebrate the opening, Taki Tsan released a new mixtape, called "Exclusive Mixtape" or "The Lost Mixtape" which was composed by 8 tracks.
In 2011, Taki joined TOMAHOK, a new crew which was created by Isvoleas. On 25 February of the same year, the group's new album, "Onoma kai Pragma" was released through No Label Records and received mixed critics from the fans, because of their changed style. His next mixtape, "Athens' Finest" was given for free download via his site, and was produced by an American beatmaker called Hamma. Taki Tsan now continues to work with Isvoleas at their third album which is to be released in 2012.

2018: Rebetiko
Taki tsan learned to play baglama and embraced the greek underground music genre called rempetiko and from now on he is known as Takaros in Youtube. His YouTube channel is named TSANNEL.

Discography with ZN
 1997 ZN Entoles/Stin Chora ton Kaliteron MCs, EP IHOKRATORIA / FM Records
 1998 Protos Tomos, IHOKRATORIA / FM Records
 2001 Thamena Ksehasmena IHOKRATORIA / FM Records
 2015 Pasa Ntoumania/Paraisthiseis, IHOKRATORIA / Capital Music

Solo Discography
 1999 Rima gia Chrima, IHOKRATORIA / FM Records
 2006 Sto Mialo tou Panagioti Stravalexi, IhoSpira / FM Records
 2009 Ein' O Man, EP, Sporty Magazine
 2009 Rima gia Chrima 2 IHOKRATORIA / 33 1/3 Entertainment
 2014 To Systima, EP, IHOKRATORIA / 33 1/3 Entertainment

Discography with Tigre Sporakia
 2003 Theoria kai praksi IHOKRATORIA / FM Records
 2011 Onoma kai Pragma No Label Records

Collaborations
 2004 To Sxoleio, with Harmanis, IXOSPIRA / FM Records
 2005 Dipli Magkia, Misa Lefta Treli Ftiaxi, with DJ ALX, IXOSPIRA
 2010 Gia Ta Paidia, with Diezel, CD Single
 2020 Vybez, with Lil Barty, Capital Music / Panik Records

Appearances
 1997 Hontres Douleies, as Timvorixos & Midenistis, FM Records
 1999 I Ihokratoria Parousiazei Meros A, with Tigre Sporakia, IXOKRATORIA / FM Records
 1999 En Opsei (Paremvoles), Polydor
 2000 La Klikaria, Imiz Biz Entertainment, Def Jam/Universal
 2001 Agnostofovia (Alfa Gama), IXOKRATORIA / FM Records
 2002 Megalos Iroas (Midenistis), IHOKRATORIA / FM Records
 2004 The Instrumentals I Like (Eisvoleas)
 2004 La Sagrada Familia (Goin' Through), Family The Label, Def Jam/Universal
 2004 Mono Gia Ta Aftia Sou (Dj Alx)
 2006 Den Ehoun Styl (Dj Alx)
 2006 Synyparxi (Evnus)
 2007 Eimai (White Dragon)
 2009 Airetika Erotikos (Mithridatis), Imiz Biz Entertainment, Legend
 2009 The Box LP, Part 1 (Cenobite), Cenobite Productions
 2010 Metaxy Ouranou Kai Gis (Gelos), IXOKRATORIA
 2010 Grand Champion Hot Joints (Dj The Boy)
 2010 Gkegke (Eisvoleas), Lyra / Tomahok
 2010 The Escape Key, IHOKRATORIA
 2010 Dask1 (Dask)
 2011 O Rapper Tis Hronias (Dimitris Mentzelos), Imiz Biz Entertainment, IHOKRATORIA, Cenobite Productions, Legend
 2011 Etsi Tin Vlepo (Skies), Lyra

References

External links
 Official Site

Greek rappers
1979 births
Living people